The  Grand Island North Light Station (also known as the Old North Light) is a lighthouse located on the north end of Grand Island near Munising, Michigan. It was listed on the National Register of Historic Places in 1985.

History
With the planned opening of the Soo Locks in 1855, it was anticipated that shipping traffic in Lake Superior would dramatically increase.  Thus, in 1853, Congress appropriated money to locate a lighthouse on the northern end of Grand Island.  A site atop a  cliff was chosen for the light, and construction commenced in 1856 on the first lighthouse located here; the light was put into service with a fourth-order Fresnel lens later that year.  However, due to the poor quality of materials used in construction, the condition of the building deteriorated rapidly, and by 1865 the light was judged to be in "wretched condition."  A replacement was recommended, and Congress appropriated more money the following year.

In 1867, the second Grand Island North Light Station was built.  This was before the founding of nearby Munising, or indeed the before the establishment of the surrounding county of Alger. The light house was built of brick, using standard plans provided by the U.S. Lighthouse Establishment. The lens was transferred from the old tower, and the light was put into service the same year.

A keeper and an assistant were stationed at the lighthouse; over the years a few minor changes were made to the boathouse location and associated stairs.  In 1941, the lamp was automated and the station was boarded up and abandoned. In 1961, a 12-volt electrical system was installed on a pole near the cliff, the earlier light was decommissioned, and the Fresnel lens removed.

The station, now surplus, was sold to Loren Graham. Restoration work was done in 1972 - 1973. The lighthouse and associated buildings are currently used as a private summer home.

Description
The Grand Island North Light Station is a two-story building constructed of brick in a rectangular plan.  A three-story,  light tower and a one-story kitchen addition are attached to the station. The station has a tin-covered gable roof supported by queen-post trusses. The exterior is painted in the original colors of yellow, white, and black, and the station as a whole looks substantially as it did when built. The tower once housed a fourth-order Fresnal lens.

Four other buildings are located on the site: a tool shed, fuel storage shed, and outhouse (all made of brick); and a wooden well-house.

See also
 Lighthouses in the United States

References

Lighthouses completed in 1867
Houses completed in 1867
Lighthouses on the National Register of Historic Places in Michigan
Lighthouses in Alger County, Michigan
1867 establishments in Michigan
Historic districts on the National Register of Historic Places in Michigan
National Register of Historic Places in Alger County, Michigan